USS Corporal (SS-346), a  submarine, was a ship of the United States Navy named for the corporal, an alternate name for the fallfish, found in streams of the eastern United States.

Construction and commissioning
Corporal was launched 10 June 1945 by Electric Boat Co., Groton, Connecticut, sponsored by Mrs. H. C. Wick; commissioned 9 November 1945 and reported to the Atlantic Fleet.

Service history
Corporal cleared New London 8 January 1946 for her base at Key West, arriving 25 February. She took part in antisubmarine warfare projects and fleet exercises off Florida and Bermuda and in the Caribbean until returning to Groton 26 February 1947. After extensive modernization, she returned to Key West 2 March 1948.

She continued to conduct training and join in exercises off Florida and in the Caribbean until her first tour of duty in the Mediterranean with the 6th Fleet from 16 July 1952 to 15 October. Returning to local operations off Key West, she also participated in large-scale fleet exercises in the Atlantic and Caribbean. She cruised to the British Isles from 11 March to 16 May 1957, and upon her return to Key West, continued training and services to the Fleet Sonar School. Through 1958 and 1959, she operated frequently in ordnance tests, and from August 1959, when Charleston, South Carolina, became her home port, cruised widely along the east coast. In December 1960 Corporal sailed to visit Germany and then join the 6th Fleet in the Mediterranean.

USS Corporal was converted to a Guppy III configuration and continued to operate throughout the 1960s and early 1970s in various capacities during the Cold War.  She made regular "Northern" runs across the Arctic Circle above the North Sea, regular "Mediterranean Cruises", frequently operated in the Caribbean and trained submarine sailors in conjunction with the Submarine School in New London, Connecticut.

In 1967 USS Corporal collided in Rhode Island's Block Island Sound with the 30-foot sloop Medea IV, whose owner afterward claimed "they never offered us assistance or asked us if we were damaged."

Helicopter landing

During naval exercises off Key West in April 1956, a US Navy Sikorsky H-34 helicopter, serial number 51, made an emergency landing on the Corporals deck because it experienced serious mechanical problems during an anti-submarine warfare exercise in which the Corporal had been serving as the opposing force. After close cooperation by radio and hasty preparations by the submariners, the distressed helicopter managed to touch down safely aft of the submarine's sail. The incident marked "the first time a helicopter made an emergency landing on a submarine." At the time of that emergency landing, the submarine was under the command of Lieutenant Commander E. O. Proctor, and those aboard the helicopter were Commander W. F. Culley and Lieutenant J. K. Johnson.

TCG Ikinci İnönü (S333) 

She was decommissioned, struck from the US Naval Register, and transferred (sold) to Turkey, under terms of the Security Assistance Program, 28 November 1973. On 12 February 1974 she was commissioned TCG Ikinci İnönü (S333) ("Second İnönü"), the second of three submarines named in honor of the Second Battle of İnönü in the Turkish Independence War.

She was dropped from the Turkish Naval rolls on 2 September 1996, and scrapped. Today, a section of hull containing the stern torpedo tubes is preserved at the Naval Museum at Istanbul.

References

External links 
 official web site USS Corporal SS346

https://web.archive.org/web/20041024221458/http://www.turkishnavy.net/submarine/liste.htm
http://www.denizaltici.com/submarine-service.htm

 

Balao-class submarines
Ships built in Groton, Connecticut
1945 ships
Cold War submarines of the United States
Ships transferred from the United States Navy to the Turkish Navy
Balao-class submarines of the Turkish Navy